Intonation may refer to:

Intonation (linguistics), variation of speaking pitch that is not used to distinguish words
Intonation (music), a musician's realization of pitch accuracy, or the pitch accuracy of a musical instrument
Intonation Music Festival, a summer music festival in Chicago

See also
Intonation unit, a segment of speech that occurs with a single prosodic contour
Tone (disambiguation)